The 1981–82 Segunda División season saw 20 teams participate in the second flight Spanish league. Celta de Vigo, UD Salamanca and CD Málaga were promoted to Primera División. Burgos, AD Almería, Levante UD and Getafe Deportivo were relegated to Segunda División B.

Team changes

To 1981–82 Segunda División 
Promoted from 1980–81 Segunda División B
 Celta Vigo (Group 1 winners)
 Deportivo La Coruña (Group 1 runners-up)
 Mallorca (Group 2 winners)
 Córdoba (Group 2 runners-up)
Relegated from 1980–81 La Liga
 Murcia (16th)
 Salamanca (17th)
 Almería (18th)

From 1980–81 Segunda División 
Relegated to 1981–82 Segunda División B
 Granada (17th)
 Palencia (18th)
 Barakaldo (19th)
 AgD Ceuta (20th)
Promoted to 1981–82 La Liga
 Castellón (winners)
 Cádiz (runners-up)
 Racing Santander (3rd)

Locations and managers

League table

Results

Top goalscorers

External links
Season overview at BDFutbol.com

Segunda División seasons
2
Spain